St Helier railway station is in the London Borough of Merton in South London. The station is served by Thameslink, and is on the Sutton Loop Line. It is in Travelcard Zone 4.

History
Parliamentary approval for a line from Wimbledon to Sutton had been obtained by the Wimbledon and Sutton Railway (W&SR) in 1910 but work was delayed by World War I. From the W&SR's inception, the District Railway (DR) was a shareholder of the company and had rights to run trains over the line when built. In the 1920s, the Underground Electric Railways Company of London (UERL, precursor of London Underground) planned, through its ownership of the DR and the City and South London Railway (C&SLR, now the Northern line), to use part of the W&SR's route for an extension of the C&SLR to Sutton. The Southern Railway (SR) objected and an agreement was reached that enabled the C&SLR to extend as far as Morden in exchange for the UERL giving up its rights over the W&SR route. The SR subsequently built the line, one of the last to be built in the London area. The station opened on 5 January 1930 when full services on the line were extended from South Merton.

The original concrete station building has been demolished.

Services
All services at St Helier are operated by Thameslink using  EMUs.

The typical off-peak service in trains per hour is:
 2 tph to 
 2 tph to 

Connections
London Buses routes 154 and S4 serve the station.

References

External links

Railway stations in the London Borough of Merton
Former Southern Railway (UK) stations
Railway stations in Great Britain opened in 1930
Railway stations served by Govia Thameslink Railway